Frederick Charles Kay (29 September 1878 – 16 April 1917) was an Australian rules footballer who played with Collingwood in the Victorian Football League (VFL).

Notes

External links 
		
Fred Kay's profile at Collingwood Forever

1878 births
1917 deaths
Australian rules footballers from Victoria (Australia)
Collingwood Football Club players